The law of August 22, 1950, establishing the status of “recusant”, stated in its first article: "The Republic, grateful to those who accepted all the risks in their fight against the enemy's war potential, considering the suffering and the prejudice that this courageous and patriotic attitude caused them, proclaimed and determined the right to reparation for recusants and their successors.

Thirteen years later, on October 21, 1963, Jean Sainteny, minister for veterans and war victims, signed the decree creating this medal, officially called "Recusant's Insignia".

The purpose of the Recusant's Insignia is to honour French citizens who evaded the Compulsory Work Service (S.T.O.) in Germany and who have therefore participated in the fight against the invader.  The service of the National Office of the Veterans and Victims of War of the department of residence delivers the card of the Recusant authorizing the wear of this insignia.

The National Recusants' Group initiated the National Recusant's Day, held annually in France on 6 June.

Award statute
The Recusant's Insignia can be worn by French citizens bearing the title of “recusant”.
Are considered recusants, persons who, prior to June 6, 1944 found themselves in the following situations:
 persons who, having been the subject of a requisition order resulting from the acts of the so-called law of 4 September 1942, decree of 19 September 1942, law of 16 February 1943 and/or law of 1 February 1944, voluntarily abandoned their business not to comply with this order;
 persons who, under the constraints mentioned in the preceding paragraph or who were victims of raids, have escaped from the territories and businesses in which they were assigned;
 persons who, under these constraints or victims of raids, were sent to Germany but who voluntarily did not return there after their first leave in France;
 persons who, without having received requisition or transfer orders, but who were entered in workforce lists or belonging to classes of mobilization likely to be called up, evaded preventively by abandoning their business.
Also those who have, since their refusal to submit or their preventive withdrawal from the laws on compulsory labour, lived on the margins of the laws of Vichy and were victims of searches or prosecution from the French or German administrations.

Are also considered recusants, persons in the departments of Bas-Rhin, Haut-Rhin or Moselle who, following their annexation by the enemy:
 either abandoned their homes in order not to respond to a mobilization order in German military or paramilitary formations;
 or abandoned their homes, whereas, being part of the mobilizable classes by the German authorities, they were at risk of being incorporated into German military or paramilitary formations.

Recusant workers from the Compulsory Work Service are eligible for the 1939–1945 Commemorative war medal

Award description
The design of the Recusant's Insignia was decided by a contest opened by a decree of 17 July 1961.  The winner,  artist engraver M. Hollebecq, was announced in the 1963 establishment decree which also directed the Paris mint to produce the insignias.

The Recusant's Insignia is a 36 mm in diameter circular medal struck from bronze or gilt bronze. Its obverse bears the relief image of a map of France, a broken anvil at its center symbolizes the refusal to work. Above the map, a Cross of Lorraine symbolizing hope and support for the oppressed. On the reverse, the circular relief inscription along the top ¾ of the medal circumference (TO THE RECUSANTS 1939 – 1945 WAR).

The medal hangs from a 37 mm wide silk moiré bright yellow ribbon with three 1 mm wide red vertical stripes spaced 1 mm apart and located 2 mm from the outer edges.

Notable recipients (partial list)
 Politician André Bord
 Politician Jean Corlin
 Astronomer Pierre Bourge
 Physicist Raimond Castaing
 Politician Bernard Restout
 Politician Louis Eyraud
 Writer Jean Vezole
 Union leader Jacques Fournier
 Politician Robert Pontillon
 Resistance fighter Roland Despains
 Politician André Fumex
 Lawyer Yves Jouffa
 Politician Jacques Sourdille
 Historian Yves Battistini

See also

 Forced labour under German rule during World War II
 German military administration in occupied France during World War II
 Arbeitseinsatz
 French Resistance
 Vichy France
 World War II

External links
 la Fédération Nationale des Rescapés et Victimes des Camps Nazis du Travail Forcé 
 Museum of the Legion of Honour

References

Civil awards and decorations of France
Awards established in 1963
Unfree labor during World War II